The flag of Kalmykia consists of a yellow field with a sky blue circle in the center containing a lotus. The yellow stands for the sun, the people and the religious faith of the nation.  The blue represents the sky, eternity, and steadiness.  The lotus is a symbol of purity, spiritual rebirth and happiness.  Its five upper petals represent the continents and the lower four stand for the quarters of the globe.  Together, they symbolize the will of the Kalmyks to live in friendship and to cooperate with all the nations of the world. 

The first post soviet flag of Kalmykia (1992-1993) was adopted by law of 30 October 1992. (Source: Government of the Republic of Kalmykia)Article 158: The National flag of the Republic of Kalmykia — Khalmg Tangch is a rectangular panel consisting of three horizontal stripes: the upper one is sky-blue, the middle one is golden-yellow and the lower one is scarlet. In the centre of the golden-yellow stripe, in a circle having a diameter equal to 1/4 of the flag width, is a sign in the form of flame of fire over the two wavy lines. The sign and the circumference are scarlet. The ratio of the width of the stripes of light blue and scarlet to the width of the golden-yellow stripe is 1:2. The ratio of the flag width to its length is 1:2.

Historical Flags

See also
 Flag of Agin-Buryat Okrug
 Flag of Buryatia
 Flag of Mongolia
 Flag of Tuva
 Flag of Ust-Orda Buryat Okrug

Flag
Flags of the federal subjects of Russia
Kalmykia
Flags introduced in 1993